Charles Cline may refer to:

Charles E. Cline (1858–1914), American politician in the state of Washington
Charlie Cline (1931–2004), musician
Doug Cline (Charles Douglas Cline, 1938–1995), American football player

See also
Charles H. Kline (1870–1933), mayor of Pittsburgh
Charles Klein (disambiguation)